Vostochnoye Degunino District ( - Eastern Degunino) is an administrative district (raion) of Northern Administrative Okrug, and one of the 125 raions of Moscow, Russia. Population: 95,700 (2017 est.).

See also
Administrative divisions of Moscow

References

Notes

Sources

Districts of Moscow
Northern Administrative Okrug